UFC 172: Jones vs. Teixeira was a mixed martial arts event that was held by the Ultimate Fighting Championship on April 26, 2014, at the Baltimore Arena in Baltimore, Maryland.

The event was released on DVD on July 29, 2014. The DVD was distributed by the label Anchor Bay Entertainment.

Background
A UFC Light Heavyweight Championship bout between the current champion Jon Jones and Glover Teixeira, briefly linked as the event headliner at UFC 169, UFC 170 and UFC 171 served as the main event.

Danny Castillo was originally expected to face Isaac Vallie-Flagg at this event. However, Castillo was replaced by Takanori Gomi and instead fought Charlie Brenneman.

Tarec Saffiedine was originally scheduled to face Jake Ellenberger in a welterweight bout, but withdrew due to a back injury. As a result, Ellenberger was removed from the card and was rescheduled to face Robbie Lawler at UFC 173.

Just one week before the event, Bobby Green suffered an injury and was forced off of the card. Yancy Medeiros, who was supposed to fight Joe Ellenberger, stepped in and faced Green's original opponent Jim Miller. Ellenberger was expected to face returning veteran Vagner Rocha.  Subsequently, just days after accepting the bout, Rocha injured himself in the week leading up to the event.  With no time to find a suitable replacement, Ellenberger was pulled from the card as well.

Results

Bonus awards
The following fighters were awarded $50,000 bonuses:
 Fight of the Night: Takanori Gomi vs. Isaac Vallie-Flagg
 Performance of the Night: Joseph Benavidez and Chris Beal

See also
List of UFC events
2014 in UFC

References

Ultimate Fighting Championship events
2014 in mixed martial arts
Mixed martial arts in Maryland
Sports competitions in Baltimore
Events in Baltimore